Galloway and Upper Nithsdale may mean or refer to:

 Galloway and Upper Nithsdale (UK Parliament constituency)
 Galloway and Upper Nithsdale (Scottish Parliament constituency)